Thalainayar (also referred to as Talanayar) is a panchayat town in Nagapattinam district in the Indian state of Tamil Nadu.
It is near Vedaranyam. It is famous for its Agraharam street, which has a Ram and Siva temple.

Demographics
 India census, Thalainayar had a population of 11,631. Males constitute 49% of the population and females 51%. Thalainayar has an average literacy rate of 67%, higher than the national average of 59.5%: male literacy is 74%, and female literacy is 59%. In Thalainayar, 13% of the population is under 6 years of age.

Transport 

It is connected to lot of  major towns like Thiruvarur, Mannargudi, Thiruthuraipoondi, Pattukkottai, Vailankanni, Nagapattinam, Vedaranyam and Kodikkarai. 

Its well connected through newly built ECR (East Coast Road) between Chennai and Thoothukudi aka Tuticorin.
There are direct buses to Coimbatore.

References

Cities and towns in Nagapattinam district